South Fairmount is a neighborhood in Cincinnati, Ohio. It contains one of the highest concentrations of Section 8 housing in Hamilton County. The population was 2,181 at the 2020 US Census. South Fairmount lies just south of the North Fairmount neighborhood.

Demographics

Source - City of Cincinnati Statistical Database

History
Fairmount began as a sprinkling of farm homes in the early 1800s. Later as the Mill Creek valley became industrialized, the creek bed was spanned and factories were located at the base of the hill. A brewery was established as early as 1825, and several more beer makers arrived in the next decades. The first newcomers were a few French and German immigrants. The community attracted Italians near the turn of the century. Fairmount developed distinct neighborhoods, I.e. North Fairmount, South Fairmount, Millvale (in northeast Fairmount), and English Woods (an early federal housing project).

Lick Run Watershed improvements
The Metropolitan Sewer District of Greater Cincinnati (MSD) is in the design stage of a stream daylighting project to restore the Lick Run which used to flow between Queen City Avenue and Westwood Avenue. MSD is required to remove 85% of the annual 14 billion gallons of the combined sewer overflows (CSOs) that occur each year in the outdated sewer system during rain events. The largest contributor to the overflows is CSO 5 in the Lick Run Watershed which dumps 1.7 billion gallons of raw sewage into the Mill Creek annually. By separating the storm water from the sanitary sewage most of the rain water can be sent straight into a creek, thus alleviating the watershed from CSOs.

Two plans have been proposed by MSD to solve the issue. The preferred plan is to daylight the stream, allowing the rain water to collect in the restored Lick Run and discharge into the Mill Creek. This option is anticipated to cost approximately $195 million. Some community opposition has been raised for this alternative with a few residents likening it to an "open drainage ditch" and concern about the existing businesses and building stock between the two thoroughfares.

The alternative "grey" solution would consist of constructing a new 25-foot diameter tunnel to replace the 19.5-foot tunnel currently in place. This alternative would not separate the storm water from the sanitary sewage so MSD would still be responsible for treating the storm water as if it is sewage. This alternative is expected to cost about $312 million.

References 

Neighborhoods in Cincinnati